Nicholas Wadada Wakiro (born 27 July 1994) is a Ugandan professional footballer who plays as a right-back for Azam F.C. of Tanzania and the Uganda national team.

Club career

Early career
Wadada began playing youth football at the age of 13 with Lukuli United in 2007. He later joined St. Mary's Kitende in 2010 and in the same year he joined Uganda Super League club Bunamwaya FC (now Vipers SC).

Bunamwaya FC
Wadada joined Bunamwaya FC in 2010 at 16 years he was a backup player in the right-back position in few games that season.

In the 2011–12 season Wadada became a regular player and was part of the team that finished runners-up in the 2011–12 Uganda Super League.

In 2012–13 Wadada played 20 league games while Bunamwaya finished third in the Uganda Premier League.

Vipers SC
In 2013–14 season his Club Bunamwaya FC changed its name to Vipers SC. Wadada maintained his first place in the team despite of Vipers SC finishing in fourth position that season. He started in 32 games and scored 3 goals.

In 2014–15 Wadada at only 20 years he became a key player and played a very big role in winning the Uganda Premier League. He played 30 games and scored 4 goals.

In 2015–16 Wadada became captain of Vipers SC. He won the Uganda Cup that season after defeating Onduparaka FC in the final. He played 34 games and scored 2 goals.

In 2016–17, Wadada captained Vipers SC team that played in the CAF Confederation Cup against Platinum Stars of South Africa. His club finished third in the Premier League. He played 35 games and netted 2 goals.

2017–18, Wadada lifted the Premier league title with Vipers SC, his second trophy as captain. he played 36 games and finished runners-up in the Uganda Cup.

Azam
In June 2018 Wadada signed a contract with Tanzanian club Azam F.C.

International career

Youth
Nicolas Wadada received  his first call-up to the Uganda U20 team (The Hippos) in 2012 during the African U20 qualifiers. He played two games against Mozambique. In the same tournament he also played in the 3–1 win against Ghana in Kampala in the first leg. He also started in the return leg in Ghana.

In 2013, he played two games for the Uganda U23 team.

Senior
Wadada received his first call on the Senior team from the Bobby Williamson the Cranes coach in 2013. He was part of the Cranes team that won the 2013 CECAFA Championship.

Wadada was among the 23 players that made it to the AFCON 2017 in Gabon. He started one game and came as a substitute in the match against Egypt.

He played all the six games in the 2018 World Cup qualifiers against Egypt, Ghana and Republic of the Congo.

Wadada scored in a match against Niger on 2 June 2018 during the Three Nation Tournament in Niamey.

Career statistics

Honours
Vipers SC
 Uganda Premier League: 2014–15, 2017–18
 Uganda Cup: 2015; runners-up 2013, 2018
 Super Cup: 2016

Uganda
 CECAFA: 2013, 2016

References

External links

1994 births
Living people
People from Buikwe District
Association football defenders
Ugandan footballers
Uganda international footballers
2017 Africa Cup of Nations players
2019 Africa Cup of Nations players
Vipers SC players
Azam F.C. players
Ugandan expatriate footballers
Expatriate footballers in Tanzania
Ugandan expatriate sportspeople in Tanzania
Uganda A' international footballers
2014 African Nations Championship players#
2018 African Nations Championship players